Texas Institute of Science (TxIS) is a global provider of research and engineering services and intellectual property through open innovation, and a global operation that exploits Eastern scientific resources on behalf of Western industries.  In 2010, TxIS was chosen as the “Next Big Thing” in technology by the Metroplex Technology Business Council. TxIS works with clients to understand their critical technology needs, to identify new inventions, innovations and technologies, and to integrate them into new or existing product lines.

History 

TxIS was formed in 2006 by Mr. Laslo Olah  to provide businesses with access to the scientific and technological expertise available in Eastern European universities and research institutes. The key to the company's strategy is a database that already contains more than 15,000 scientists from member universities with a wide range of specialties. Using scientists at the universities, located in Eastern Europe, Russia and China, TxIS offers an efficient and low-cost option to the client companies, many of whom are too small to have a cadre of scientists on the payroll.

Company 

TxIS global headquarters are in Richardson, Texas with additional offices in:
 Houston, Texas,
 Pécs, Hungary,
 Prague, Czech Republic,
 Bucharest, Romania,
 Ploiești, Romania,
 St. Petersburg, Russia,
 Sofia, Bulgaria,
 Dnipro, Ukraine,
 Częstochowa Poland,
 and Shanghai, China.

References 

 “Next Big Thing”, Metroplex Technology Business Council.  Retrieved April    2010.http://www.metroplextbc.org/index.php?src=gendocs&ref=Next%20Big%20Thing&category=Innovation
 Bloomberg Business Week, Retrieved October 2011.
 “Startup teams scientists and U.S. firms”, Dallas Business Journal.  Retrieved April 2007

Companies based in Richardson, Texas